Pork Soda is the third studio album by the American funk metal band Primus, released on April 20, 1993, certified Gold in September 1993 and certified Platinum in May 1997. The 2005 re-issue comes in a digipak and contains a booklet with lyrics printed to nine songs, omitting "Pork Soda" which consists of a series of unintelligible rants.

The album was performed in its entirety for the first time at the Fox Oakland Theatre on December 31, 2015.

Music and lyrics
The album contains darker content than previous Primus efforts, featuring lyrics dealing with murder ("My Name Is Mud"), suicide ("Bob"), and alienation ("Nature Boy"). The band has commented that prior to recording, they had been touring for nearly two solid years and were thus in a somber mood, although in a 2015 interview frontman Les Claypool described the era surrounding the album as "Good times, happy times. It's not like we were reflecting any personal drama or anything."

Regarding the song "Wounded Knee" drummer Tim Alexander said "I needed a name. I was reading this book called Bury My Heart at Wounded Knee. It was something I never really thought about before... I mean how this country came to be. We are taught to be so proud. But a lot of what we have is based on lies and deceit. They only teach you what they want you to know. I hope people will see the title and check it out. Next time you listen to 'Wounded Knee', try and put the story and the music together. The rhythm and the pulse, there is an element of it that is angry then peaceful."

Reception

In his review for AllMusic, Steve Huey contends that Pork Soda is "one of the strangest records ever to debut in the Top Ten." He notes that the album "showcases the band's ever-increasing level of musicianship" and that "[their] ensemble interplay continues to grow in complexity and musicality", although "[the] material isn't quite as consistent as Seas of Cheese". He concludes that "the band keeps finding novel variations on their signature sound, even if they never step out of it." Reviewing the album for Entertainment Weekly, Deborah Frost notes that "the band is starting to gel". She describes Pork Soda as "goofy" and "Zappa-esque", predicting that the "alternative-metal-fusion will appeal mostly to folks who like a little fizz with their lard." In his review for the album, Robert Christgau calls Primus "quite possibly the strangest top-10 band ever, and good for them." Tom Sinclair, for Rolling Stone, describes the album as "an amalgam of elements that have no reason to be joined together in a sane universe", noting that "the band invokes the circa '69 Mothers of Invention and Trout Mask Replica-era Captain Beefheart as often as it does George Clinton or Bootsy Collins." He concludes that "hard-core funk-metal freaks may find it all a bit diffuse, but if you think its high time surrealism entered the mosh pits of America, Pork Soda just may be your cup of meat."

Indy Metal Vault writer Chris Latta wrote: "Frizzle Fry or Sailing the Seas of Cheese are better introductions to the world of Primus, but Pork Soda makes for a demented subversion once you've gotten used to the formula". Latta also wrote that it was the band's darkest and most unique album, although a couple of filler tracks kept it from being their best album.

Track listing

Personnel

Primus
Les Claypool – vocals, bass guitar, mandolin (tracks 1 & 14), double bass
Larry LaLonde – electric guitar, banjo (tracks 12 & 15)
Tim "Herb" Alexander – drums, percussion, marimba, bicycle bell (track 15)

Production
Derek Featherstone – engineer
Leslie Gerard-Smith – project coordinator
John Golden, K-Disk – mastering
Manny LaCarrubba, Neil King, Kent Matchke – second engineers
Ron Rigler – engineer
Tom Whalley – A&R direction

Visual art
Jay Blakesburg – front cover and background photography
Paul "Bosco" Haggard – cover layout
Lance "Link" Montoya – sculpture
Snap – airbrushing

Charts
Album

Singles

References

Primus (band) albums
1993 albums
Interscope Records albums
Albums with cover art by Lance Montoya